Emanuela Rei is an Italian actress and singer. She is best known for portraying Maggie Davis in Maggie & Bianca: Fashion Friends and Jasmine in Aladin - Il musical geniale.

Biography  
Emanuela Rei was born on 26 February 1991, in Rome, Italy. She started studying acting at a young age, and her first professional role was in a 2010 episode of the television series, I Cesaroni.

Following this, Emanuela Rei played the part of Alex in eBand in 2012. From 2012 to 2013, she appeared as Greta Gironi in Talent High School - Il Sogno di Sofia. Between 2013 and 2014, she played Emma in Anastasia <3 Dance.

From 2016 to 2017 Rei starred as Maggie Davis in Maggie & Bianca: Fashion Friends.

Filmography

References 

1991 births
Living people
Actresses from Rome
Italian singers